Jeffery J. Magrum is an American businessman, plumber, and politician serving as a member of the North Dakota Senate from the 8th district. He previously served in the North Dakota House of Representatives from the 28th district.

Early life and education 
Mangrum is a native of Hazelton, North Dakota. He attended the North Dakota State College of Science for one year.

Career 
Mangrum is the owner of the Magrum Excavating and Plumbing Company. He is a licensed master plumber and water well contractor. Magrum has also served as mayor of Hazelton, North Dakota. He was elected to the North Dakota House of Representatives in November 2016 and assumed office on December 1, 2016.

References 

Living people
People from Emmons County, North Dakota
American plumbers
Republican Party members of the North Dakota House of Representatives
Year of birth missing (living people)